= Deborah Muoio =

Professor of medicine

Deborah Marie Muoio

Academic background
- Education: University of Florida, University of Buffalo, University of North Carolina- Chapel Hill, Duke University
- Thesis: Fatty acid partitioning in muscle and liver : novel sites of regulation (1999)

Deborah Marie Muoio is the George Barth Geller Distinguished Professor of Cardiovascular Disease at Duke University. She is known for her work on diabetes, obesity, and metabolism.

== Education and career ==
Muoio grew up in the Buffalo area of New York. She earned her Bachelor’s of Science degree at the University of Florida. After which she originally planned to pursue medical school but instead returned to western New York to University of Buffalo to complete her M.S. degree in nutrition in 1992. She then went on to earn her Ph.D. in nutritional biochemistry at the University of North Carolina, Chapel Hill in 1999. She completed postdoctoral fellowships at East Carolina and Duke Universities working in muscle physiology and metabolic disease. Muoio joined Duke University in 2002, and she was promoted to professor of medicine in 2016. In 2021 she was named the George Barth Geller Distinguished Professor of Cardiovascular Disease at Duke University.

== Research ==
Muoio is known for her research in diabetes, metabolic regulation, mitochondrial energy, muscle physiology and exercise. Muoio's early research examined the lipids in skeletal muscles and metabolic stress responses. She has also worked on how the body's metabolism responds to overeating.

== Selected publications ==
- Muoio, Deborah M; Dohn, G Lynis; Fiedorek, Frederick T; Tapscott, Edward B; Coleman, Rosalind A (1 August 1997). "Leptin Directly Alters Lipid Partitioning in Skeletal Muscle". Diabetes. 46 (8): 1360–1363. doi:10.2337/diab.46.8.1360. ISSN 0012-1797. PMID 9231663.
- Muoio, Deborah M.; Newgard, Christopher B. (1 June 2006). "Obesity-Related Derangements in Metabolic Regulation". Annual Review of Biochemistry. 75 (1): 367–401. doi:10.1146/annurev.biochem.75.103004.142512. ISSN 0066-4154. PMID 16756496.
- Koves, Timothy R.; Ussher, John R.; Noland, Robert C.; Slentz, Dorothy; Mosedale, Merrie; Ilkayeva, Olga; Bain, James; Stevens, Robert; Dyck, Jason R.B.; Newgard, Christopher B.; Lopaschuk, Gary D.; Muoio, Deborah M. (2008). "Mitochondrial Overload and Incomplete Fatty Acid Oxidation Contribute to Skeletal Muscle Insulin Resistance". Cell Metabolism. 7 (1): 45–56. doi:10.1016/j.cmet.2007.10.013. PMID 18177724.
- Muoio, Deborah M.; Newgard, Christopher B. (2008). "Molecular and metabolic mechanisms of insulin resistance and β-cell failure in type 2 diabetes". Nature Reviews Molecular Cell Biology. 9 (3): 193–205. doi:10.1038/nrm2327. ISSN 1471-0072. PMID 18200017. S2CID 3335727.
